The 2006 Regions Morgan Keegan Championships and the Cellular South Cup were tennis tournaments played on indoor hard courts. It was the 31st edition of the Regions Morgan Keegan Championships, the 21st edition of the Cellular South Cup, and was part of the International Series Gold of the 2006 ATP Tour, and of the Tier III Series of the 2006 WTA Tour. Both the men's and the women's events took place at the Racquet Club of Memphis in Memphis, Tennessee, United States, from February 20 through February 26, 2006.

Finals

Men's singles

 Tommy Haas defeated  Robin Söderling, 6–3, 6–2

Women's singles

 Sofia Arvidsson defeated  Marta Domachowska, 6–2, 2–6, 6–3

Men's doubles

 Chris Haggard /  Ivo Karlović defeated  James Blake /  Mardy Fish, 0–6, 7–5, [10–5]

Women's doubles

 Lisa Raymond /  Samantha Stosur defeated  Victoria Azarenka /  Caroline Wozniacki 7–6(7–2), 6–3

External links
Official website

 
Regions Morgan Keegan Championships
Cellular South Cup
Regions Morgan Keegan Championships and the Cellular South Cupl
Regions Morgan Keegan Championships and the Cellular South Cup
Regions Morgan Keegan Championships and the Cellular South Cup